Ratkovská Lehota is a village and municipality in the Rimavská Sobota District of the Banská Bystrica Region of southern Slovakia. In the second half of the 16th century the village was pillaged, but resettled by the end of the 17th century. Main engagement of the locals is agriculture. Interesting sightseeing is evangelical church from 1787.

References

External links
 
https://web.archive.org/web/20160730235001/http://ratkovskalehota.e-obce.sk/
http://svinica.ou.sk/ratkovska-lehota-o48-uvod.html
Blog about life in Ratkovská Lehota

Villages and municipalities in Rimavská Sobota District